William Marshall Hughes (6 March 1918 – 16 June 1981) was a Welsh professional footballer who played as a left back. He made 169 appearances in the First Division for Birmingham and Chelsea. As an international, he won 10 full caps for Wales and also played for a Great Britain XI in 1947.

Career

Club career
Born in Llanelli, Hughes joined Birmingham from Llanelli A.F.C. in 1934 and made his first-team debut in January 1936 when still only 17; by the time he was 19 he was a regular first choice. He was mature for his age and was described as a ball-winning defender who tried to use the ball constructively once he won it. During the Second World War he made 49 wartime league appearances for Birmingham. While serving in the Royal Air Force he made guest appearances for Blackpool, Swansea Town, Fulham and Chester. In all he played 110 senior games for Birmingham before joining Luton Town; eight months later they sold him for £12,000 to Chelsea, for whom he also played more than 100 games. He then moved to Hereford United, who were then playing in the Southern League, followed by Flint Town United, with whom he won his only major club honour, the Welsh Cup, in 1954.

International career
Hughes made his international debut for Wales on 30 October 1937 in a 2–1 win over Scotland; he was only 19 and played alongside Birmingham clubmates Seymour Morris and Dai Richards. From that match until the outbreak of the Second World War, Hughes was an ever-present in the Welsh side. He also played in 14 of Wales' 17 wartime and Victory internationals, and later captained the team during the 1947 British Home Championship. In 1944 he toured France and Belgium with an FA Combined Services XI. On 25 November 1944, at Hillsborough, he also played for a Royal Air Force XI in a 7–1 defeat against Scotland. His teammates on the day included, among others, Stanley Matthews, Stan Mortensen, Raich Carter and Frank Soo. In 1947 he also played for a Great Britain XI against a Rest of Europe XI to celebrate the return of the Home Nations to FIFA.

Later years
After retiring from playing, Hughes scouted for Chester. He died in Birmingham in 1981 at the age of 63.

Honours
with Wales
British Home Championship (shared): 1939
with Flint Town United
Welsh Cup winners: 1954

References
General
 
 
Specific

1918 births
Footballers from Llanelli
1981 deaths
Welsh footballers
Wales international footballers
Wales wartime international footballers
Association football fullbacks
Llanelli Town A.F.C. players
Swansea City A.F.C. players
Birmingham City F.C. players
Luton Town F.C. players
Chelsea F.C. players
Hereford United F.C. players
Fulham F.C. wartime guest players
English Football League players
Blackpool F.C. wartime guest players
Chester City F.C. wartime guest players
Chester City F.C. non-playing staff
Flint Town United F.C. players
Royal Air Force personnel of World War II